United Church of Canastota is a historic church at 144 W. Center Street in Canastota, New York.

It was built in 1903 and added to the National Register of Historic Places in 1986.

References

Churches on the National Register of Historic Places in New York (state)
Gothic Revival church buildings in New York (state)
Churches completed in 1903
20th-century churches in the United States
Churches in Madison County, New York
National Register of Historic Places in Madison County, New York